Craighead County Courthouse may refer to:

Craighead County Courthouse (Jonesboro, Arkansas)
Craighead County Courthouse (Lake City, Arkansas)